Engyodontium aranearum is a species of ascomycete fungus in the family Cordycipitaceae. It parasitizes the long bodied celllar spider (Pholcus phalangioides). It causes 100% mortality in infected spiders.

References

Fungi described in 1984
Cordycipitaceae